1970 in philosophy

Publications
 Hannah Arendt, On Violence
 Phillipa Foot, Morality and Art, Oxford University Press
 Michel Foucault, The Order of Things (translation from French), London: Tavistock Publications
 Alvin Goldman, A Theory of Human Action, Prentice-Hall
 D. Z. Phillips, Faith and Philosophical Inquiry, London: Routledge
 W. V. O. Quine, Philosophy of Logic, Prentice-Hall
 Nicholas Rescher, Scientific Explanation, New York: The Free Press
 John Searle, Speech Acts
 Richard Swinburne, The Concept of Miracle
 Mary Warnock, Existentialism, Oxford University Press
 Nicholas Wolterstorff, On Universals–An Essay in Ontology, University of Chicago Press

Births
 February 21 - Christian Lotz
 March 6 - Vincent F. Hendricks
 March 20 - Robert Arp
 April 22 - Nicole C. Karafyllis
 September 1 - Sam Gillespie (died 2003)
 September 16 - Lars Svendsen
 Cressida Heyes
 William Irwin (philosopher)
 Daniel Ross (philosopher)
 Kyle Stanford
 Yannis Stavrakakis
 Robert B. Talisse

Deaths
 January 6 - Philip Wheelwright (born 1901)
 January 7 - Fritz Heinemann (born 1889)
 February 2 - Bertrand Russell (born 1872)
 February 3 - Max Hamburger (born 1897)
 April 4 - Khoren Sargsian (born 1891)
 June 14 - Roman Ingarden (born 1893)
 July 23 - K. N. Jayatilleke (born 1920)
 August 17 - Harry Allen Overstreet (born 1875)
 September 2 - Vasyl Sukhomlynsky (born 1918)
 September 14 - Rudolf Carnap (born 1891)
 October 8 - Lucien Goldmann (born 1913)
 October 12 - Andreas Speiser (born 1885)
 October 30 - Heinrich Blücher (born 1899)
 December 16 - Friedrich Pollock (born 1894)
 December 21 - Johannes Jacobus Poortman (born 1896)
 December 23 - Carlos Astrada (born 1894)

References

Philosophy
1970-related lists
20th-century philosophy
Philosophy by year